The Calgary Dinos are the athletic teams that represent the University of Calgary in Alberta, Canada. They were known as the "Dinosaurs" but usually referred to as the "Dinos" until 1999, when the name was officially shortened. Some of its venues are the Jack Simpson Gymnasium (basketball m/w, volleyball m/w, track and field m/w), McMahon Stadium (football, soccer m/w), Hawkings Field (field hockey), University of Calgary Aquatic Centre (swimming, often shortened to Aquatic Centre) and a 200m Running Track (cross-country and track & field practices).

The men and women hockey teams play at Father David Bauer Olympic Arena. Historically in the rare case of scheduling conflicts, both men's and women's hockey have used the Max Bell Centre for games.  In recent years, no such scheduling conflict has occurred.

Teams
Calgary Dinos teams compete in:
 Baseball (m)
 Basketball (m/w) 
 Cross country running (m/w)
 Field hockey (w) 
 Football (m)
 Golf (m/w)
 Ice hockey (men/women)
 Ringette
 Rowing (m/w)
 Rugby (m/w) 
 Soccer (m/w) 
 Softball (w)
 Swimming (m/w)
 Tennis (m/w)
 Track and field (m/w)
 Volleyball (m/w)
 Wrestling (m/w)

Football

Hockey

Men's ice hockey

Women's ice hockey

Ringette
The 2003-04 season marked the inaugural year for the Calgary Dinos university ringette team based out of the University of Calgary. The Dinos became Calgary's first university ringette team and proceeded to win the gold medal at the 2004 University Challenge Cup in Winnipeg for its inaugural appearance. The Canadian University and College Ringette Association (CUCRA) is responsible for organizing university and college ringette in Canada.

The addition of the Dinos team was considered a significant step in the development of ringette by aiding in the development of a national intercollegiate ringette league and also gave post-secondary aged players opportunities they never previously had. The University of Calgary team competed in the Ringette Calgary league in what was then the Deb/Intermediate division. The team was coached by Beth Veale, Bob Kerr and Bruce Hammond. Beth Veale was considered the individual who was largely responsible for getting the program off the ground.

University Challenge Cup record
: 2004, 2005, 2006, 2007, 2008, 2009, 2010, 2011, 2016, 2018, 2019

Basketball

Women's basketball

Awards and honors

Canada West Hall of Fame
Hayley Wickenheiser, Ice Hockey: Canada West Hall of Fame - 2021 Inductee  
Jodi Evans, Basketball: Canada West Hall of Fame - 2021 Inductee 
Leighann Reimer, Basketball: Canada West Hall of Fame - 2020 Inductee 
Theresa Maxwell, Basketball: Canada West Hall of Fame - 2019 Inductee 
Stephanie Gawlinski, Soccer: Canada West Hall of Fame - 2019 Inductee
Kathy Truscott, Soccer: Canada West Hall of Fame - 2019 Inductee

Athletes of the Year

The University of Calgary Athletes of the Year are named in honor of Dr. Dennis Kadatz.

References

External links
 

 
U Sports teams
Dinos, Calgary
U Sports teams in Alberta